The Shadow Ministry of Kim Beazley was the opposition Australian Labor Party shadow ministry of Australia from 19 March 1996 to November 2001, opposing John Howard's Coalition ministry.

The shadow cabinet is a group of senior Opposition spokespeople who form an alternative Cabinet to the government's, whose members shadow or mark each individual Minister or portfolio of the Government.

Kim Beazley became Leader of the Opposition upon his election as leader of the Australian Labor Party on 19 March 1996, and appointed his first Shadow Cabinet.

Shadow Ministry (March 1996 to October 1998)
The following were members of the Shadow Cabinet:

Shadow Ministry (October 1998 to November 2001)

Shadow Cabinet

Outer Shadow Ministry

Parliamentary Secretaries

See also 
 First Howard Ministry
 Second Howard Ministry
 Second Keating Ministry
 Shadow Ministry of Simon Crean

References 

Politics of Australia
Opposition of Australia
Beazley